Eriodictyol is a bitter-masking flavanone, a flavonoid extracted from yerba santa (Eriodictyon californicum), a plant native to North America.  Eriodictyol is one of the four flavanones identified in this plant as having taste-modifying properties, the other three being homoeriodictyol, its sodium salt, and sterubin.

Eriodictyol was also found in the twigs of Millettia duchesnei, in Eupatorium arnottianum, and its glycosides (eriocitrin) in lemons and rose hips (Rosa canina).

References

External links

Flavanones
Bitter-masking compounds
Catechols
Resorcinols